Garra railway station is the railway station of Garra village in Balaghat district, Madhya Pradesh, India. Its station code is GRHX. It serves the SECR railways. It is on the Gondia–Balaghat–Katangi line.

References

Railway stations in Balaghat district